The 2021 Asian Men's Volleyball Championship was the twenty-first staging of the Asian Men's Volleyball Championship, a biennial international volleyball tournament organised by the Asian Volleyball Confederation (AVC) with Japan Volleyball Association (JVA). The tournament was held in Chiba and Funabashi, Japan from 12 to 19 September 2021. 

The top two teams of the tournament qualified for the 2022 FIVB Volleyball Men's World Championship as the AVC representatives.

Host selection
On 11 February 2020, the AVC announced that only one national federation have applied two bids to organize 2021 Asian Championship:

Qualification
Following the AVC regulations, The maximum of 16 teams in all events will be selected by
 team for the host country
 teams based on the final standing of the previous edition
 teams from each zones (with a qualification tournament if needed)

Qualified teams

 Japan qualified as the hosts, is originally top 10 of previous edition. The spot was reallocated to zonal entrants.
 Indonesia, the Philippines, and Vietnam also submitted their entry for their participation in the tournament. However they could not be accommodated due to all 16 teams already confirmed at the time; This include the confirmation of the participation of 3 Western Asian teams and the conclusion of the Central Asia qualifier. Thailand was granted the sole Southeast Asian berth, the top ranked Southeast Asian team in the 2019 edition, which has earlier confirmed their participation. No qualification tournament was held.
 Sri Lanka originally qualified but withdrew due to all of its players and staff testing positive for COVID-19. As a result, Uzbekistan replaced Sri Lanka in August 2021.

Zonal qualification
Only the Central Asian qualification tournament was held which was contested by Sri Lanka and Uzbekistan at Sugathadasa Indoor Stadium in Colombo, Sri Lanka. 
Time is Sri Lanka Standard Time (UTC+05:30).

|}

Pools composition

Preliminary round
Teams were seeded in the first two positions of each pool following the serpentine system according to their final standing of the 2019 edition. AVC reserved the right to seed the hosts as head of Pool A regardless of the final standing of the 2019 edition. All teams not seeded were drawn in Bangkok, Thailand on 16 July 2021. Final standings of the 2019 edition are shown in brackets except the hosts who ranked 3rd.

Pots

Classification round

Squads

Venues

Pool standing procedure
 Number of matches won
 Match points
 Sets ratio
 Points ratio
 If the tie continues as per the point ratio between two teams, the priority will be given to the team which won the last match between them. When the tie in points ratio is between three or more teams, a new classification of these teams in the terms of points 1, 2 and 3 will be made taking into consideration only the matches in which they were opposed to each other.

Match won 3–0 or 3–1: 3 match points for the winner, 0 match points for the loser
Match won 3–2: 2 match points for the winner, 1 match point for the loser

Preliminary round
All times are Japan Standard Time (UTC+09:00).

Pool A

|}

|}

Pool B

|}

|}

Pool C

|}

|}

Pool D

|}

|}

Classification round
All times are Japan Standard Time (UTC+09:00).
The results and the points of the matches between the same teams that were already played during the preliminary round shall be taken into account for the classification round.

Pool E

|}

|}

Pool F

|}

|}

Pool G

|}

|}

Pool H

|}
|}

Final round
All times are Japan Standard Time (UTC+09:00).

13th–16th places

13th–16th semifinals
|}

15th place match
|}

13th place match
|}

9th–12th places

9th–12th semifinals
|}

11th place match
|}

9th place match
|}

5th–8th places

5th–8th semifinals
|}

7th place match
|}

5th place match
|}

Final four

Semifinals
|}

3rd place match
|}

Final
|}

Final standing

Awards

Most Valuable Player

Best Setter

Best Outside Spikers

Best Middle Blockers

Best Opposite Spiker

Best Libero

See also
2021 Asian Women's Volleyball Championship
2021 Asian Men's Club Volleyball Championship

References

External links
Official website
Regulations
Squads

 
Asian Men's Volleyball Championship
Asian Men's Championship
International volleyball competitions hosted by Japan
2021 in Japanese sport
Asian Volleyball Championship